General Charles Pelot Summerall (March 4, 1867 – May 14, 1955) was a senior United States Army officer. He commanded the 1st Infantry Division in World War I, was Chief of Staff of the United States Army from 1926 to 1930, and was President of The Citadel between 1931 and 1953.

Childhood and education
Summerall was born in Blounts Ferry, Columbia County, Florida, on March 4, 1867 and attended the Porter Military Academy in South Carolina from 1882 to 1885. After graduation, he worked as a school teacher for three years. In 1888 he enrolled in the United States Military Academy (USMA) at West Point, New York, graduating in June 1892. His fellow classmates included numerous men who would later attain general officer rank, such as Julian Robert Lindsey, Tracy Campbell Dickson, Frank W. Coe, William Ruthven Smith, James Ancil Shipton, Louis Chapin Covell, Preston Brown, George Blakely, Robert Mearns, Peter Weimer Davison, Howard Russell Hickok, Henry Howard Whitney, John E. Woodward, John McAuley Palmer and George Columbus Barnhardt.

Early career
Commissioned as a second lieutenant, Summerall was assigned to the 1st Infantry Regiment, transferring to the 5th Artillery Regiment in March 1893. He performed garrison duty in California from 1893 to 1895, then served at Fort Hamilton, New York from 1895 to 1898. During the Spanish–American War, he was assigned to the Department of the Gulf as aide to the commander and as an engineer officer in 1898 to 1899, receiving promotion to first lieutenant in March 1899.

Summerall participated with his unit in the Philippine Insurrection in 1899 to 1900, and was a member of the China Relief Expedition in 1900 to 1901, participating in the attack on Peking. He was promoted to captain and assigned to the 106th Coast Artillery Company in July 1901. He served at Forts Walla Walla and Lawton, in Washington state, commanding the latter post in 1901 to 1902. He was on duty at Camp Skagway and was in charge of preliminary work at Fort Seward in Alaska. He commanded Fort Flagler in 1902 to 1903, and then was transferred to the 3rd Field Artillery Battery with duty at Camp Thomas and Fort Myer in 1903 to 1905.

Summerall was the senior instructor of artillery tactics at West Point from 1905 to 1911. He was promoted to major in March 1911, and commanded the field artillery of the Maneuver Division at San Antonio, Texas. He commanded the summer camps of instruction for army and National Guard artillery in 1912 to 1914, was assistant chief of the Militia Bureau and in charge of National Guard artillery in 1915 to 1917. He was engaged in purchasing artillery ranges, and was a member of the Ordnance Board from 1915 to 1916, the commission to investigate the manufacture of munitions in 1916, the Board of Ordnance and Fortification in 1917, and the military mission to British and French armies in 1917. He was promoted to lieutenant colonel in 1916, colonel in 1917, and brigadier general in the National Army in August 1917.

World War I

Summerall commanded the 67th Field Artillery Brigade and the 1st Field Artillery Brigade in operations in France in 1917, was promoted to major general in the National Army, and successively commanded his brigade, the 1st Division, and V Corps, in the Cantigny, Soissons, St. Mihiel, and Meuse-Argonne operations in 1918. "Late on November 9th, instructions from the Allied Commander-In-Chief were transmitted by G.H.Q., A.E.F., directing a general attack, which was executed by the First Army on November 10th–11th. Crossings of the Meuse were secured by General Summerall's (V) Corps during the night of November 10th–11th and the remainder of the army advanced on the whole front." Summerall's actions on November 10–11 resulted in over eleven hundred American casualties. Some have criticized the allied operations in the final days of the war, including those ordered by Summerall, as causing unnecessary loss of life, but they are more understandable in the context of previous failed peace attempts and rumors. Marshal Ferdinand Foch, the Allied Supreme Commander, warned General John Joseph "Blackjack" Pershing, Commander-in-Chief of the American Expeditionary Forces (AEF) on the Western Front, on November 5: "It can happen that the enemy may spread rumors that an armistice is signed in order to deceive us. There is none. Let no one cease hostilities of any sort without information from the Marshal, Commander-In-Chief."

According to historian Niall Ferguson, Major General Summerall was equally capable of issuing orders that violated the laws and customs of war, as when he ordered U.S. Marine Corps officer Elton Mackin, "Way up there to the north is a railhead... Go cut it for me. And when you cut it, you will go hungry if you try to feed the prisoners you will take... Now I say, and you remember me on this, on those three ridges, take no prisoners."

Later, Summerall commanded IX and IV Corps and served on the American Peace Commission at the Peace Conference in 1919.

Leadership and character

General John J. Pershing, in a hand-written dedication to the official Report of the First Army, wrote in 1924: "To Major General Charles P. Summerall, whose loyal and distinguished services as Brigade, Division, and Corps Commander during Allied operations of the American Expedition army forces in the World War will ever remain the pride of his associates and will ever mark him as one of the outstanding figures of that great struggle. Especially will his name be linked with the wonderful achievements of the First Division which exemplifies his character as a soldier and a leader."

Brigadier General Theodore Roosevelt Jr. wrote in a letter to future Army Chief of Staff George C. Marshall: "in my humble opinion, General Summerall was the biggest troop leader we had in the American army and you were the best tactician. I have quite often expressed this view to people whom I know and you would be pleased and surprised to know how many agree with me." General Thomas T. Handy, discussing the impact of "real leaders", said "I remember old man Summerall, 5th Corps, way back in World War I. His personality was felt all the way down through it."

War correspondent Thomas Johnson wrote: "To command the V Corps in the place of General Cameron, came the epitome of a military leader, daring and careful, ruthless and inspiring, a Christian and a fighter, whose officers and men worshipped him, Major-General Charles P. Summerall of the 1st Division." He later observes "Summerall was spiritually a Civil war corps commander, mentally a scientific modern soldier, a twentieth-century Stonewall Jackson. He could deliver an exhortation to make men cry and curse and beg to get at the Germans."

In World War I, Summerall became embittered by General Joseph T. Dickman. During an attempted attack on Sedan in early November 1918, based on misleading orders by General Pershing, Summerall failed to coordinate with Dickman's I Corps and ordered his subordinate, Brigadier General Frank Parker, who had succeeded him in command of the 1st Division, to attack the city. During the attack, Parker's 1st Division entered Dickman's sector and mixed with two of his divisions and a French unit, causing confusion, delays and friendly fire incidents. Although the episode had no relevant military consequences, Gary Nichols reports, that even after Summerall became chief of staff, he attributed all criticism or resistance he encountered to supporters of Dickman, so "it became almost impossible to criticize him without incurring his wrath."

Post-war career

Summerall commanded the 1st Division in 1919 to 1921, receiving promotion to brigadier general of the regular army in February 1919 and to major general in April 1920. He commanded the Hawaiian Department from August 1921 to August 1924. Colonel William "Billy" Mitchell visited Summerall during his command in Hawaii, and criticized the lack of air defenses for the islands. This angered Summerall, who attempted to preside over Mitchell's 1925 court-martial. Summerall testified against Mitchell, who was convicted and sentenced to a five-year suspension from duty.

After commanding the Eighth and Second Corps Areas from 1924 to 1926, Summerall was appointed Chief of Staff of the United States Army. He served from 21 November 1926 until 20 November 1930, and was promoted to general in February 1929. During his tenure he directed the formation of a mechanized force and recommended an integrated mobile force of tank, artillery, engineer, and quartermaster elements. In 1927, Summerall joined the South Carolina Society of the Sons of the American Revolution, and he later became its president.

Summerall retired from active service in March 1931, and was president of The Citadel from 1931 until 1953. He died in Washington, D.C., on 14 May 1955. Summerall is buried in Arlington National Cemetery.

The elite rifle drill team at The Citadel is named The Summerall Guards in his honor. The Citadel's parade field, edged by the cadet barracks and most of the main buildings on campus, is named after him. The Summerall Chapel on the campus of The Citadel, built in 1936, is named for Summerall as well. Summerall Field is the main parade ground on Fort Myer, Virginia, where change of command ceremonies, retirements, the twilight tattoo and other major events are held featuring the 3d Infantry Regiment.

Awards
General Summerall's military awards include the following –
 Distinguished Service Cross
 Distinguished Service Medal
 Silver Star with three oak leaf clusters
 Spanish War Service Medal
 China Campaign Medal
 Philippine Campaign Medal
 Mexican Border Service Medal
 Victory Medal
 Grand Cordon, Order of Polonia Restituta (Poland)
 Grand Officer, Order of the Crown of Belgium
 Grand Officer, Order of Prince Danilo I (Montenegro)
 Commander, Legion of Honor (France)
 Commander, Order of the Crown of Italy
 Order of Military Merit of Cuba
 Croix de Guerre (France) with two Palms
 Military Medal of the Second Class, Republic of Panama

Citations
Summerall's received the Distinguished Service Cross as commanding general of the 1st Division. The citation for the award reads:

In contrast to the official citation, Colonel Conrad S. Babcock, commander of the 28th Infantry Regiment at Berzy-le-Sec, contended that Summerall was not at the front until after the battle.

The citation for Summerall's Distinguished Service Medal is as follows:

Dates of rank

See also

 The Summerall Guards

References

Bibliography

External links

 World War I: Wasted Lives on Armistice Day by Joseph E. Persico (2005)
 The Citadel Archives: Charles Pelot Summerall Collection

|-

|-

|-

|-

1867 births
1955 deaths
United States Army Infantry Branch personnel
United States Army Field Artillery Branch personnel
People from Columbia County, Florida
Military personnel from Florida
Burials at Arlington National Cemetery
People of the Spanish–American War
United States Army Chiefs of Staff
United States Army generals of World War I
United States Military Academy alumni
American military personnel of the Boxer Rebellion
Prisoner of war massacres
Recipients of the Distinguished Service Cross (United States)
Recipients of the Distinguished Service Medal (US Army)
Recipients of the Silver Star
Presidents of The Citadel, The Military College of South Carolina
United States Army generals
United States Military Academy faculty